Wattle Wood is a   nature reserve north-west of Tenterden in Kent. It is managed by Kent Wildlife Trust.

This ancient coppice with standards wood has diverse flora and fauna. Flowers include early purple orchids, and there are mammals such as dormice.

References

Kent Wildlife Trust
Tenterden